Robert G. Laughlin (died August 8, 1985) was a college basketball coach and athletics administrator. He was the head coach of Morehead State from 1953 to 1965. He coached Morehead State to a 166–120 record, winning four Ohio Valley Conference championships and three NCAA tournament appearances.  He also played his college basketball at Morehead State.  He was inducted into the Morehead State athletics Hall of Fame in 1985.  The Laughlin Health Building at Morehead State University is named in his honor.

Laughlin died on August 8, 1985 at age 74.

Head coaching record

References

Year of birth missing
1985 deaths
American men's basketball coaches
American men's basketball players
Morehead State Eagles athletic directors
Morehead State Eagles men's basketball coaches
Morehead State Eagles men's basketball players